Jeewan Jyoti is a 1953 Indian Hindi-language film directed by Mahesh Kaul. It is the debut film of the lead actors Shammi Kapoor & Chand Usmani. It also stars Shashikala.

Plot

Cast 
 Shammi Kapoor as Shyam Sundar "Shammi"
 Chand Usmani as Kishori
 Shashikala as Leela
 Leela Mishra as Ganga
 Dulari as Jamna
 Nazir Hussain as Dr. Abdul Hamid
 Moni Chatterjee as Master Dinanath

Soundtrack

References

External links 
 

1953 films
1950s Hindi-language films
Films scored by S. D. Burman
Indian drama films
1953 drama films
Indian black-and-white films